Oligella urethralis is a Gram-negative, oxidase-positive, nonfermentative bacterium of the genus Oligella (first known under Moraxella urethralis) which can cause urosepsis.

References

External links
Type strain of Oligella urethralis at BacDive -  the Bacterial Diversity Metadatabase

Burkholderiales
Bacteria described in 1987